Gamal El-Araby Ahmad (born 4 September 1954) is an Egyptian politician who served as Minister of Education from December 2011 to July 2012 in the Cabinet of Kamal Ganzouri.

He was educated at Ain Shams University and the University of East Anglia. He was formerly a mathematics teacher.

Professional Experience
 Head of the Central Administration of Secondary Education, Ministry of Education
 Undersecretary of the Ministry of Education in Qalyubiya
 Undersecretary of the Ministry of Education in Dakahlia
 Director General of Banha Management 30/6/2008
 Appointed Director General of Banha Educational Administration as of 12/3/2008
 Director of Banha Educational Administration 2007-2008
 Director of the Training Center 2001-2007
 Mathematics instructor 1995-2001
 Teaching Mathematics as a teacher and first teacher 1976-1995

Achievements
 First place in the competition of the distinguished director at the level of the center - New Horizon
 The first place in the contest of distinguished director at the governorate level - Ministry of Administrative Development
 The ideal leader in the governorate of Qalioubia sub-committee Benha
 The ideal teacher at the level of the Republic - General Union of Teachers

References

1954 births
Living people
Ain Shams University alumni
Alumni of the University of East Anglia
Education Ministers of Egypt